The 2012–13 Weber State Wildcats men's basketball team represented Weber State University during the 2012–13 NCAA Division I men's basketball season. The Wildcats, were led by seventh year head coach Randy Rahe and played their home games at the Dee Events Center. They were members of the Big Sky Conference. They finished the season 30–7, 18–2 in Big Sky play to finish in second place. They advanced to the championship game of the Big Sky tournament where they lost to Montana. They were invited to the 2013 CIT where they defeated Cal Poly, Air Force, Oral Roberts and Northern Iowa to advance to the championship game where they lost to East Carolina. They set a school record for wins in a season with 30.

Roster

Schedule

|-
!colspan=9 style=| Exhibition

|-
!colspan=9 style=| Regular season

|-
!colspan=9 style=| Big Sky tournament

|-
!colspan=9 style=| CollegeInsider.com tournament

References

Weber State Wildcats men's basketball seasons
Weber State
Weber State
Weber State Wildcats men's basketball
Weber State Wildcats men's basketball